The Women's individual event of the Biathlon World Championships 2016 was held on 9 March 2016.

Results
The race was started at 13:00 CET.

References

Women's individual
2016 in Norwegian women's sport